Leukershausen is a village in the eastern district of Schwäbisch Hall in Baden-Württemberg, Germany.

Church 

There is one church in Leukershausen that is named for its patron, St. John the Apostle.  It is part of the Evangelical Church in Germany.

Schwäbisch Hall (district)